Richard Angulo (born August 13, 1980) is an American football coach and former tight end who is the tight ends coach for the Jacksonville Jaguars of the National Football League (NFL). He previously served as an assistant coach for the Baltimore Ravens

Angulo played college football at Western New Mexico and was drafted by the St. Louis Rams in the seventh round of the 2003 NFL Draft. He played for 8 seasons in the NFL with the Rams, Minnesota Vikings, Jacksonville Jaguars, Cleveland Browns and Chicago Bears.

Coaching career

Baltimore Ravens
Angulo was the Baltimore Ravens' tight ends coach from 2015 to 2016. He was moved to assistant offensive line coach on January 12, 2017. He took over as offensive line coach for the team's week 12 game in 2020 against the Pittsburgh Steelers, replacing Joe D'Alessandris who missed the game due to illness.

Jacksonville Jaguars
On February 17, 2022, Angulo was hired by the Jacksonville Jaguars as their tight ends coach under head coach Doug Pederson.

References

External links
Jacksonville Jaguars profile
Cleveland Browns profile
Jacksonville Jaguars profile

1980 births
Living people
American football tight ends
Baltimore Ravens coaches
Chicago Bears players
Cleveland Browns players
Jacksonville Jaguars coaches
Jacksonville Jaguars players
Minnesota Vikings players
Players of American football from Albuquerque, New Mexico
St. Louis Rams players
Western New Mexico Mustangs football players